Kyl21 is an ice cream with popsicles in futuristic looking geometric shapes, new textures and gourmet recipes. 

The science-food-company Molekyleis Produktionsgesellschaft mbH (Kyl) was founded in 2014 by product designer and marketing specialist David Marx in Berlin. David Marx produces flash-frozen ice using his own technology based on liquid nitrogen, which allows popsicles in geometric shapes, new textures and highend (gourmet) recipes.

The molekylice came out of the Science Kitchen - an independent food lab based in Berlin that specialized in molecular gastronomy by inventing and developing food products for a sustainable, vegan-friendly future. The Molekylice is produced in Los Angeles (here under the brand name DreamPops) and China (under the brand name BOOM).

The Kyl21 name is a mash-up of the Norwegian word for molecule "molekyl", and the age (21+) of Marx's intended popsicle audience (Kyl is pronounced "kühl", IPA: [kyːl], the German word for "cool").
Through crowdinvesting at Companisto, Kyl21 was able to collect € 940.650 (ca. US $ 1.2 Million) venture capital. Despite this large sum the company subsequently failed to open a sales location or bring a single product to market in Germany. The apparent lack of any visible company activity caused major uproar among investors accusing David Marx of fraudulent behavior. As of 2021 the former company website is offline and the whereabouts of the collected funds are unknown.

See also

 List of ice cream brands

References

Ice cream brands
Molecular gastronomy
Companies based in Berlin